Pon. Muthuramalingam is an Indian politician and former minister and Member of the Legislative Assembly of Tamil Nadu. He was elected to the Tamil Nadu legislative assembly as a Dravida Munnetra Kazhagam candidate from Madurai West constituency in 1984 and 1989 elections.

References 

Dravida Munnetra Kazhagam politicians
Living people
Year of birth missing (living people)
Tamil Nadu MLAs 1985–1989